Last Singer Standing is an Irish singing competition show that was first broadcast on 23 October 2021 on RTÉ One.

Production 
On 30 June 2021, Nicky Byrne was announced as the host of a new RTÉ One singing competition show called, Take On Me. Applications for the show were announced that same day. On 18 August 2021, RTÉ announced at their new season launch the show had been renamed, Last Singer Standing and Nicky would be joined by a panel of three pop music experts, Girls Aloud singer, Nadine Coyle, *NSYNC member, Joey Fatone and singer-songwriter, Samantha Mumba.

The series was the first production to be filmed in Font Hill Studios.

Contestants

Results summary

Format

Round 1 
Each episode features eight players. At the top of each episode, one player is randomly selected to play the game. The contestant steps up and will have to choose a song that could help keep their place on the show. However, as they are performing, the other contestants can buzz in and challenge the contestant. The original player must select one of the contestants to face off against, this contestant will then step up and sing a different song. At the end of Round One, the panel votes on who is progressing.

Round 2 
For Round Two, the winner stays on and we run through the process again, this time, with different song options. However, at the end of Round Two, it’s the fellow contestants who vote one by one on who is remaining in the game after two singers have performed.

Round 3 
Once again, the winner stays on into Round Three, where new song options are presented and more people challenge. At the end of this round, the show turns to the studio audience for the final decision. They select who that show’s Last Singer Standing is and is therefore advancing to the final. The four players who never had a chance to play or perform will return the following week, alongside four brand new players, to play the game all over again.

The Final 
After seven weeks, the seven champions from the seven previous episodes battle it out in the final where one of them will be crowned Last Singer Standing, taking home a cash prize of €25,000. The result is decided by a combination of votes from the studio audience, the panel and the twenty-five eliminated contestants.

References

External links 
 

2021 Irish television series debuts
Irish reality television series
RTÉ original programming
Singing talent shows